FC Hazovyk-KHV Kharkiv was a professional football team based in Kharkiv, Ukraine. KHV stands for Kharkiv Gas Drilling (Mining).

Established in 2001, they competed in 5 seasons in the Ukrainian Second League (Group B). The club withdrew from the competition during the winter break in the 2007/2008 season. They played their games at "Hazovyk" stadium in Krasnokutsk.

League and cup history

{|class="wikitable"
|-bgcolor="#efefef"
! Season
! Div.
! Pos.
! Pl.
! W
! D
! L
! GS
! GA
! P
!Domestic Cup
!colspan=2|Europe
!Notes
|-
|align=center|2003–04
|align=center|3rd "C"
|align=center|7
|align=center|30
|align=center|15
|align=center|3
|align=center|12
|align=center|37
|align=center|34
|align=center|48
|align=center|1/32 finals
|align=center|
|align=center|
|align=center|
|-
|align=center|2004–05
|align=center|3rd "C"
|align=center|6
|align=center|28
|align=center|12
|align=center|7
|align=center|9
|align=center|36
|align=center|35
|align=center|43
|align=center|1/32 finals
|align=center|
|align=center|
|align=center|
|-
|align=center|2005–06
|align=center|3rd "C"
|align=center|7
|align=center|24
|align=center|10
|align=center|7
|align=center|7
|align=center|41
|align=center|34
|align=center|37
|align=center|1/32 finals
|align=center|
|align=center|
|align=center|
|-
|align=center|2006–07
|align=center|3rd "B"
|align=center|11
|align=center|28
|align=center|8
|align=center|7
|align=center|13
|align=center|20
|align=center|36
|align=center|31
|align=center|1/32 finals
|align=center|
|align=center|
|align=center|
|-
|align=center|2007–08
|align=center|3rd "B"
|align=center|18
|align=center|34
|align=center|1
|align=center|3
|align=center|30
|align=center|14
|align=center|41
|align=center|6
|align=center|1/64 finals
|align=center|
|align=center|
|align=center|
|}

See also
 UkrGasVydobuvannya

Notes and references

 
Hazovyk-KhGV, FC
Hazovyk-KhGV Kharkiv
Association football clubs established in 2001
Association football clubs disestablished in 2008
2001 establishments in Ukraine
2008 disestablishments in Ukraine